Intellectual property rights (IPRs) have been acknowledged and protected in China since the 1980s. China has acceded to the major international conventions on protection of rights to intellectual property. Domestically, protection of intellectual property law has also been established by government legislation, administrative regulations, and decrees in the areas of trademark, copyright, and patent. This has led to the creation of a comprehensive legal framework to protect both local and foreign intellectual property. Despite this, copyright violations are extremely common in the PRC. The American Chamber of Commerce in China surveyed over 500 of its members doing business in China regarding IPR for its 2016 China Business Climate Survey Report, and found that IPR enforcement is improving, but significant challenges still remain. The results show that the laws in place exceed their actual enforcement, with patent protection receiving the highest approval rate, while protection of trade secrets lags far behind. Many US companies have claimed that the Chinese government has stolen their intellectual property sometime in 2009–2019.

International conventions
In 1980, China became a member of the World Intellectual Property Organization (WIPO).

It has patterned its IPR laws on the Berne Convention for the Protection of Literary and Artistic Works and the Agreement on Trade-Related Aspects of Intellectual Property Rights (TRIPS).

China acceded to the Paris Convention for the Protection of Industrial Property on 19 December 1984 and became an official member on 19 March 1985. China also acceded to the Madrid Agreement for the International Registration of Trademarks in June 1989.

In January 1992, the PRC entered into a Memorandum of Understanding with the United States government to provide copyright protection for all American "works" and for other foreign works. Several bilateral negotiations have been conducted between the two governments. At some points, trade sanctions were threatened by the two governments over IPRs issues. At the conclusion of negotiations in 1995, the Sino-US Agreement on Intellectual Property Rights was signed. In June 1996, the two governments entered into another agreement protecting American intellectual property in the PRC.

Generally, once the PRC has acceded to an international treaty, the People's Courts can quote the provisions of the treaty directly in deciding an intellectual property infringement case, without reference to a Chinese domestic law by which the treaty provision is incorporated.

National legal framework
The legal framework for protecting intellectual property in the PRC is built on three national laws passed by the National People's Congress: the Patent Law, the Trademark Law and the Copyright Law. A great number of regulations, rules, measures and policies have been made by the NPC Standing Committee, the State Council and various ministries, bureaux and commissions. The circulars, opinions and notices of the Supreme People's Court also form part of the legal framework.

Trademark law

The Trademark Law of the People's Republic of China (中华人民共和国商标法) sets out general guidelines on administration of trademarks, protection of trademark owners' exclusive rights and maintenance of quality of products or services bearing the registered trademarks, "with a view to protecting consumer interests and to promoting the development of the socialist market economy."

Adhering to Article 4 of the Paris Convention, the Chinese government passed the Provisional Regulations Governing Application for Priority Registration of Trademarks in China to grant the right of priority to trademark applications submitted in PRC by the nationals of the Paris Convention member countries.

Copyright law

History
The concept of copyright in China has been found to exist at least as far back as the Song dynasty (960–1279). The publishers of a work at that time wrote on the final page of a text that it could not be copied. The first modern official code was implemented in 1910 at the end of the Qing dynasty (1636–1912). A new version was issued in 1915 during the Warlord Era of the Republic of China. On May 23, 1928 the Nationalist Government enacted a copyright law that covered books, music, paintings, photographs, engravings, and models. The copyright for most items existed for 30 years after the death of the author. Translations of literary works had a 20 year copyright and photographs had a 10 year copyright after publication. Corporate copyright existed for 30 years after publication.

The Peoples Republic of China abolished all statutes in 1949. A new formal copyright statute was not adopted until 1991. The ROC copyright statutes are retained on Taiwan (inherited from the Japanese empire in 1945, see also Copyright law in Japan).

Current Law

In most cases the copyright term is the life of the author plus 50 years, but for cinematographic and photographic works and works created by a company or organization the term is 50 years after first publication.

To implement the Berne Convention and the Universal Copyright Convention, as well as bilateral copyright treaties signed between the PRC and other foreign countries, the PRC government passed the Regulations on Implementation of International Copyright Treaties (1992). These have given foreign copyright holders protection for their rights and interests in the PRC.

Before the PRC acceded to the Berne Convention, computer software was not treated as a kind of literary work under the Copyright Law. In May 1991, the State Council passed the Computer Software Protection Rules. Based upon these rules, the Measures for Computer Software Copyright Registration were formulated by the then Ministry of Engineering Electronics Industries. These regulations provide a set of rules covering the definitions of various terms and the registration, examination and approval of computer software programmes in the PRC. At the moment both the Berne Convention and these two domestic computer regulations are co-effective. However, in the event of any inconsistencies, the Berne Convention prevails.

The Berne Convention does not require copyright registration, and thus protection in the PRC technically does not require registration. However, registering copyrights for literary works can avoid, or at least simplify, ownership disputes. Copyright registration cost is 300 RMB. On the downside, the copyright registration process requires the registrant to disclose detailed information, including software source code, which companies might be reluctant to share.

Patent law

China passed the Patent Law of the PRC (中华人民共和国专利法) to encourage invention-creation and to promote the development of science and technology. The subsequent Implementing Regulations of the Patent Law of the PRC added clarification.

Other legislation
Apart from major legislation on trademarks, copyright and patents, a few other laws and regulations have been passed to deal with intellectual property related issues. In 1986, the General Principles of Civil Law was adopted to protect the lawful civil rights and interests of citizens and legal persons, and to correctly regulate civil relations. Articles 94-97 of the General Principles of Civil Law deal with intellectual property rights of Chinese citizens and legal persons.

In the 1990s, many more pieces of legislation were passed to perfect the intellectual property protection system. These include the Regulations on Customs Protection of Intellectual Property Rights (1995) and the Law Against Unfair Competition of the PRC (1993). The latter prohibited the passing off of registered trademarks, infringing trade secrets, the illegal use of well-known goods or names of other people, as well as other misleading and deceptive conduct. The Advertising Law of the PRC was passed in 1994 and extensively revised in 2015, to now include a joint liability with the advertising spokesperson, special regulations on public interest advertising, and most importantly a definition of misleading advertisement.

A Foreign Investment Law introduced in late 2019 banned forced technology transfers.

Implementation
To enforce IPR protection, an administrative system has been established within the government. After the reshuffle of the State Council in March 1998, the Patent Office became part of the State Intellectual Property Office. The Trademarks Office is still under the authority of the State Administration for Industry and Commerce. The Copyright Office falls within the State Administration for Press and Publication. A similar system exists at various levels of local government. Commonly, enforcement of IPRs will be carried out by local IPRs personnel, assisted by police from the local Public Security Bureau.

The number of IP cases prosecuted criminally in Chinese courts has been on a significant upward trend from 2005 to 2015, suggesting tougher enforcement of IP laws.

Foreign firms have been increasingly successful in litigating patent infringement suits in China, winning approximately 70% of the time in the period 2006 to 2011, and rising to approximately 80% in the late 2010s.

Creation of Specialized Intellectual Property Courts and Tribunals 
Since 2008, filings for patent and trademark protection by both Chinese and national firms have skyrocketed, leading to increased government focus on IP protection, including establishing specialized intellectual property courts to more effectively resolve disputes. These courts have many similarities to specialized IP courts in other parts of the world, such as the Intellectual Property High Court in Japan, in that they focus on developing expertise within a highly technical field of law. In August 2014, the National People's Congress promulgated a decision to pilot 3 specialized intellectual property courts in Beijing, Shanghai, and Guangzhou. 

In October 2014, the Supreme People's Court provided additional regulatory guidance on specialized intellectual property court jurisdiction. The specialized IP courts sit at the intermediate court level and have first instance jurisdiction over all technically complex civil and administrative IP cases (including patents, new plant varieties, integrated circuit layout designs, trade secrets, and computer software). They also have first instance jurisdiction over well-known trademarks and deal with all other IP cases upon appeal from the basic people’s courts in their province.86 In terms of administrative law, the Beijing Intellectual Property Court also has special, first-instance jurisdiction over administrative appeals brought against decisions issued by administrative IP adjudication bodies. Since 2017, the system has expanded to include 20 specialized IP tribunals across the country. Although these tribunals are administratively a part of the intermediate people’s court in their city, they have cross-regional and exclusive subject matter jurisdiction over IP cases—similar to the IP courts established in 2014.

Customs Enforcement 
Customs protection is another positive mechanism in law enforcement with regard to IPRs. The Regulations on Customs Protection of Intellectual Property Rights (中华人民共和国知识产权海关保护条例), promulgated in June 1995, strengthened border control to stop counterfeited goods from coming into, or leaving, the PRC.

Despite this regulation existing as a legislative capacity, the ability to enforce these laws varies according to the differing interpretations that exist amongst the local governmental authorities in China. Despite the growing number of raids on hubs for traders of counterfeited goods and the rise in the number of lawsuits brought against companies that use counterfeited technology, codes, or logos, the level of government response does not match the degree to which counterfeiting is happening in China. The rate at which the legal implementation has proceeded more closely matches the desires of IP protection from Chinese businesses and other bastions of capital.

Difficulties
The enforcement of protection of intellectual property rights is particularly difficult in the PRC. Without adequate education with regard to IPRs, there is little awareness that infringement is a crime. For example, though the first intellectual property law was drafted in 1982, the first IPR training centre was not established until 1996.

Sometimes local protectionism may dilute the strength of central legislation or the power of law enforcement. For example, local governments might not want to genuinely support the work of copyright protection supervisors. It may create obstacles during IPRs investigation and assist local counterfeiters by letting them hide their production lines in safer places. When counterfeiters have good connections with local governmental or law enforcement officials, they may find an umbrella for their counterfeiting activity.

Chinese government-sponsored search-engine Baidu provides links to third-party websites that offer online counterfeit products as well as access to counterfeit hardware and merchandise. The Chinese government dominates 70% of its country's search engine revenue and has been called on by US officials to limit the activity of online counterfeiting groups.

Cases
The first major dispute on violation of intellectual property rights was filed in April 1992 by Wang Yongmin, the inventor of Wubi, against Dongnan Corporation.

According to Zheng Chengsi, the first major copyright case involving a foreign party was Walt Disney Productions vs. Beijing Publisher and Co.

In March 1992 Chinese authorities found that Shenzhen reflective materials institute had copied 650,000 Microsoft Corporation holograms. The institute was found to be guilty of trademark infringement against Microsoft, but was fined a mere US$252. Losses to Microsoft as a result of the infringement are estimated at US$30 million.

In 2001, the China Environmental Project Tech Inc. filed a patent infringement lawsuit against American company Huayang Electronics Co. and Japanese FKK after those companies profited using a CEPT patented technique for using seawater in a fuel gas desulphurization process. Though the Supreme Court ruled in favor of CEPT, the court failed to issue an injunction because the infringing process was being used to generate electricity and an injunction would interfere with the public interest. The court instead awarded RMB 50 million to CEPT.

In 2007, CHINT Group Co. Ltd sued French low-voltage electronics manufacturer Schneider for infringement of a circuit breaker utility model patent. The Wenzhou Intermediate People's Court ruled in CHINT's favor, awarding RMB 334.8 million to the Chinese manufacturer, the highest amount ever in a Chinese IP case. After Schneider appealed to the High Court of Zhejiang province, the courts mediated the issue and the parties settled for RMB 157.5 million. In its judgement, the Wenzhou Intermediate People's Court labeled the case "the no. 1 case of patent infringement in China". At the EU–China summit 2007, EU Trade Commissioner Peter Mandelson said, "I regard the SCHNEIDER case as a test case of the level playing field in China on intellectual property protection that we want to see".

In 2010, US law firm Gipson Hoffman & Pancione filed a suit against the Chinese government on allegations of distributing an unlicensed version of the cyber-filtering software of the US company Solid Oak.

In September 2019, Levi's won final judgment in Guangzhou IP Court on a trademark infringement in Guangzhou, China. The case centred on the "arcuate design on two pockets at the back of jeans", which has been protected in China since its registration there in 2005. The company won damages and costs in addition to a ban on future infringements. The infringer's ignorance of the trademark was no bar to punishment.

U.S. Priority Watchlist
In 2014, the Office of the United States Trade Representative once again placed China on its "priority watch list" for intellectual property rights violations, along with other nations. In addition, the U.S., based on claims brought to it by the China Copyright Alliance (CCA) – a group of major copyright industry associations and select companies – brought two World Trade Organization cases against China, one focused on intellectual property rights violations, and one based on market access deficiencies.  In both cases, it was ruled that China must change its operating standards to comply with WTO rules; in the IPR case, a helpful standard was established as to the definition of "commercial scale" for which criminal penalties would be required, but found that the U.S. had not supplied sufficient evidence to show that China's 500 copy threshold for criminal liability left some "commercial scale" infringement cases without a criminal remedy.

See also
 China International Copyright Expo
First Sino-American Forum of Intellectual Property Rights
 List of statutes of China
 Music copyright infringement in China
China–United States trade war (2018–present)
Allegations of intellectual property theft by China

References

Further reading

 Clark, Douglas, Patent Litigation China, 2nd Ed (2015), Oxford University Press.
 Farah, Paolo Davide and Cima, Elena, "China’s Participation in the World Trade Organization: Trade in Goods, Services, Intellectual Property Rights and Transparency Issues" in Aurelio Lopez-Tarruella Martinez (ed.), Tirant lo Blanch, Valencia (Spain) 2010, pp. 85–121. . Available at SSRN.com

 Safran, Brian J., "Western Perceptions of China's Intellectual Property System," U. Puerto Rico Bus. L.J. (Vol. 3, Iss. 2) Available at uprblj.com
Suttmeier, Richard P. and Xiangkui Yao, China's IP Transition: Rethinking Intellectual Property Rights in a Rising China (NBR Special Report, July 2011)

People's Republic of China intellectual property law

fr:Droit des brevets en Chine